Alfiano Natta is a comune (municipality) in the province of Alessandria in the Italian region Piedmont, located about  east of Turin and about  northwest of Alessandria.

Alfiano Natta borders the following municipalities: Calliano, Castelletto Merli, Moncalvo, Odalengo Piccolo, Penango, Tonco, and Villadeati.

Alfiano Natta is one of the main economic core of the Alessandria's area, due to its wine products, which are common in the whole world and Italy, it is also famous because of its landscapes attractions of the nature, and this is possible due to the low pollution in the air than other big cities as Milan or Rome.

References

Cities and towns in Piedmont
Articles which contain graphical timelines